Belleair Shore is a town in Pinellas County, Florida, United States. It was established in 1955. As of the 2010 census, it had a population of 109.

Geography
The town is located at 27.91742 N, 82.84945 W on the Gulf of Mexico.

One of Florida's smallest and thinnest incorporated towns, Belleair Shore is located entirely on the west side of Gulf Boulevard, bounded by the Gulf to the west, Belleair Beach to the north and east, and Indian Rocks Beach to the south.

Demographics

The census of 2000 incorrectly reported that the population of this town was 0. The 2010 Census reported 109 residents.

References

External links
Town of Belleair Shore official website
Belleair Shore Community Profile at epodunk.com

Towns in Pinellas County, Florida
Towns in Florida
Populated coastal places in Florida on the Gulf of Mexico
Beaches of Pinellas County, Florida
Beaches of Florida